Nørdre Kalvehølotinden is a mountain in Vang Municipality in Innlandet county, Norway. It is the 165th tallest peak in Norway. The mountain is surrounded by several other notable mountains including Raslet and Rasletinden to the northeast, Kalvehøgde to the north, and Torfinnstindene to the northwest. The lake Bygdin lies just south of the mountain.

See also
List of mountains of Norway by height

References

Vang, Innlandet
Mountains of Innlandet